George Washington Memorial Park may refer to:

 George Washington Memorial Park (Jackson, Wyoming), also known as "Town Square"
 George Washington Memorial Park (Paramus, New Jersey), a cemetery